Daryl Stubel (born 3 September 1965 in Regina, Saskatchewan) is a Canadian Paralympic athlete. He competed in the 1988 Summer Paralympics in athletics and the 1996 and 2000 Summer Paralympics in wheelchair rugby. In the 1988 Paralympics, he won a silver medal in the men's 400 metres.

References

1965 births
Athletes (track and field) at the 1988 Summer Paralympics
Living people
Paralympic silver medalists for Canada
Athletes from Regina, Saskatchewan
Wheelchair rugby players at the 1996 Summer Paralympics
Wheelchair rugby players at the 2000 Summer Paralympics
Medalists at the 1988 Summer Paralympics
Paralympic medalists in athletics (track and field)
Paralympic track and field athletes of Canada
Canadian male wheelchair racers